William Molyneux Rose (20 September 1842 – 13 January 1917) was an English first-class cricketer.

Rose was born in September 1842 at Wolston, Warwickshire. He was educated at Eton College. After leaving Eton, Rose purchased the rank of ensign in the 32nd Foot in July 1860. He resigned his commission in May 1865. He made his debut in first-class cricket for the Gentlemen of Marylebone Cricket Club against the Professionals of Marylebone Cricket Club at Lord's in 1867. He made three further first-class appearances in 1867, playing for the Marylebone Cricket Club against Surrey, for the South of the Thames in the North of the Thames v South of the Thames fixture, and once more for the Gentlemen of Marylebone Cricket Club against Kent. He made his next first-class appearance in 1870 for the Gentlemen of Marylebone Cricket Club against Kent, before making two first-class appearances in 1871, with Rose appearing for the North in the North v South fixture, and for the Gentlemen of Marylebone Cricket Club against Kent. A right-arm slow lob bowler, he took 23 wickets at an average of 9.52, with best figures of 8 for 71, which was one of two five wicket hauls he took in first-class cricket, alongside taking ten wickets in a match once. Rose died at Wolston in January 1917.

References

External links

1842 births
1917 deaths
People from the Borough of Rugby
People educated at Eton College
32nd Regiment of Foot officers
English cricketers
Gentlemen of Marylebone Cricket Club cricketers
Marylebone Cricket Club cricketers
North of the Thames v South of the Thames cricketers
North v South cricketers